The 2010 Bauer Watertechnology Cup was a professional tennis tournament played on indoor carpet courts. It was the thirteenth edition of the tournament which was part of the 2010 ATP Challenger Tour. It took place in Eckental, Germany between 1 and 7 November 2010.

ATP entrants

Seeds

 Rankings are as of October 25, 2010.

Other entrants
The following players received wildcards into the singles main draw:
  Matthias Bachinger
  Lado Chikhladze
  Jan-Lennard Struff
  Marcel Zimmermann

The following players received entry from the qualifying draw:
  Alex Bogdanovic
  Marius Copil
  Farrukh Dustov
  Bastian Knittel
  Frederik Nielsen (LL)

Champions

Singles

 Igor Sijsling def.  Ruben Bemelmans, 3–6, 6–2, 6–3

Doubles

 Scott Lipsky /  Rajeev Ram def.  Sanchai Ratiwatana /  Sonchat Ratiwatana, 6–7(2), 6–4, [10–4]

External links
Official website
ITF Search 
2010 Combo Sheet

Bauer Watertechnology Cup
Challenger Eckental
Ecken